The Dead River is a river of Minnesota.  The river flows through the north–central part of Morse Township in northern Saint Louis County, and is a tributary of the Burntside River.

See also
List of rivers of Minnesota

References
Notes

Bibliography
Minnesota Watersheds
USGS Hydrologic Unit Map - State of Minnesota (1974)

Rivers of Minnesota
Rivers of St. Louis County, Minnesota